Ramal de Reguengos, originally called Linha do Guadiana, was a railway branch line which connected the stations of Évora and Reguengos de Monsaraz, in Portugal. It was opened on 6 April 1927.

See also 
 List of railway lines in Portugal
 History of rail transport in Portugal

References

Sources
 

Iberian gauge railways

Railway lines in Portugal
Railway lines opened in 1927